The Cello Concerto in A minor, Op. 40, was composed by Gerald Finzi in 1955.

The piece is in three movements:
I. Allegro moderato
II. Andante quieto
III. Rondo: Adagio - Allegro giocoso

The concerto was written as the result of a request by John Barbirolli, and first performed by Barbirolli and the Hallé Orchestra, with Christopher Bunting as the soloist at the Cheltenham Music Festival on 19 July 1955. The first radio broadcast of the concerto was given on the night before Finzi died in 1956.

Part of the second movement was used as the signature tune for the BBC Radio 2003 of adaptation of C. P. Snow's Strangers and Brothers.

External links
Cello Concerto
Boosey & Hawkes
Review by Robert Stumpf II on Classical.net
Gerald Finzi: His Life and Music
Symphony Pro Musica Program Notes - November 2001

Finzi, Gerald
Compositions by Gerald Finzi
1955 compositions
Compositions in A minor